Cheese:  A Global History is a non-fiction account of cheese in history and literature by Andrew Dalby. The book explores accounts of cheese in fiction and through historical records, beginning from its unrecorded discovery but with emphasis on more recent developments. It discusses aspects of culture and language as they relate to cheese.

Edition
 Andrew Dalby, Cheese: A Global History. London: Reaktion Books; Chicago: Chicago University Press, 2009.  (Edible Series)

References

Cheese
Books about food and drink